Hundall is a hamlet in North East Derbyshire in the county of Derbyshire in England.

Location
West Handley lies just south of the village of Apperknowle, south-west of Marsh Lane, East of Unstone west of West Handley.

History
Although today the hamlet is nothing more than a group of large farm houses, the villages in this area were known for Sickle and Scythe manufacturing.

References

Hamlets in Derbyshire
North East Derbyshire District